Lux-Development S.A., better known as LuxDev, is the aid and development agency of the government of Luxembourg.

It was created in 1978 as an agency to support small and medium enterprises in Luxembourg and only became an agency for development cooperation in 1992. Now, LuxDev is a société anonyme (S.A.) whereby their stockholders are the state of Luxembourg (98%) and the state-owned bank Société Nationale de Crédit et d'Investissement (2%).

LuxDev is headquartered next to the Place des Martyrs in Luxembourg City, but it has regional offices in Hanoi (Vietnam), Pristina (Kosovo), Dakar (Senegal), Praia (Cape Verde), Ouagadougou (Burkina Faso), Niamey (Niger) and Managua (Nicaragua).

Mission

LuxDev handles almost all of the resources allocated by the government of Luxembourg to bilateral official development assistance. It can however also execute programs financed by other bilateral donors and the European Commission.

Field of activity

The Agency manages projects in four main sectors: local development (agriculture and food security, decentralisation and local governance, water and sanitation), education (especially vocational education and training), microfinance and health.

Programmes are concentrated in Luxembourg's nine privileged partner countries, Burkina Faso, Cape Verde, El Salvador, Laos, Mali, Nicaragua, Niger, Senegal and Vietnam. Additionally, other countries that receive support are Mongolia, Serbia, Kosovo and Montenegro.

Numbers and facts

In 2011 LuxDev managed 115 projects and programmes and disbursed a total amount of 78,323,358 euros.

The agency was certified ISO 9001:2000 in 2005.

LuxDev is a member of Eunida and Train4Dev.

According to the OECD, 2020 official development assistance from Luxembourg decreased 9.2% to USD 450 million.

See also
 List of development aid agencies

References

External links
 LuxDev website

Government agencies of Luxembourg
International development agencies